Ayoshi Talukdar is an Indian actress, who primarily works in Bengali cinema industry. In 2021, she is going to make her Bollywood debut with the film Uma, which is directed by Tathagata Singha.

Career
Talukdar started her acting career with her first movie Oskar. Apart from Oskar she has acted in many films such as Satyanweshi Byomkesh, Thai Curry, Dadur Kirti. In 2021 she is going to make her Bollywood debut with the film Uma, which is directed by Tathagata Singha.

Filmography

Films

Web series

References

External links 
 
 Ayoshi Talukder Moviebuff profile

Living people
Bengali actresses
Actresses in Bengali cinema
21st-century Indian actresses
Indian film actresses
Year of birth missing (living people)